Brendan Thomas Carr (born January 5, 1979) is an American lawyer who has served as a member of the Federal Communications Commission (FCC) since 2017. Appointed to the position by Donald Trump, Carr previously served as the agency's general counsel and as an aide to FCC commissioner Ajit Pai. In private practice, Carr formerly worked as a telecommunications attorney at Wiley Rein. 

Described as "the right's regulator-in-chief," Carr supports changes to Section 230 of the Communications Decency Act and opposes net neutrality protections. Carr is noted for his support for banning TikTok on national security grounds. In office, Carr has been noted for being unusually vocal about public policy issues for a regulatory appointee, accusing House Intelligence Committee chair Adam Schiff of overseeing a “secret and partisan surveillance machine”.

Early life and education
Carr was born on January 5, 1979, in Washington, DC. He graduated from Georgetown University in 2001 with a Bachelor of Arts in government. He later attended Catholic University of America's Columbus School of Law, where he was an editor of the Catholic University Law Review. He graduated in 2005 with a Juris Doctor magna cum laude.

Legal career 
From 2005 to 2007, Carr was an associate in private practice at the law firm Wiley Rein, where he worked on appellate and telecommunications legal matters. He was a law clerk for Judge Dennis Shedd of the U.S. Court of Appeals for the Fourth Circuit from 2007 to 2008, then rejoined Wiley Rein.

Early FCC career 
Carr joined the Federal Communications Commission (FCC) as a legal advisor to commissioner Ajit Pai. In this capacity, Carr advised on wireless, public safety, and international issues. In January 2017, Carr became general counsel of the FCC.

Member of the Federal Communications Commission (FCC) 
President Donald Trump nominated Carr to become a commissioner of the FCC in June 2017, and Carr was confirmed by the United States Senate in August 2017. Carr was renominated to a full five year term by President Trump in 2018 and confirmed by Congress on a voice vote on January 2, 2019. His term runs from July 1, 2018 to June 30, 2023.

Tenure

Trump administration 
As a member of the FCC, Carr has been noted for being unusually vocal about public policy issues for a regulatory appointee. While in office, Carr accused House Intelligence Committee chair Adam Schiff of overseeing a “secret and partisan surveillance machine”. Carr argued in 2020 that the World Health Organization was “beclowned” in its response to the COVID-19 pandemic. 

In the run-up to the 2020 presidential election, Carr publicly accused social media platforms of being biased against the Trump reelection campaign. During an on-air interview with Lou Dobbs Tonight on Fox News, Carr stated that "Since the 2016 election, the far left has hopped from hoax to hoax to hoax to explain how it lost to President Trump at the ballot box." 

In 2020, observers including Doug Brake of the Information Technology and Innovation Foundation (ITIF) and Chris Lewis of Public Knowledge speculated that Carr would be a leading candidate to serve as FCC chairman under a second term for Trump.

Biden administration 
In 2021, Carr criticized the Biden Administration's proposal for $100 billion in new broadband deployment as part of the original American Jobs Plan proposal. In May 2022, Carr called for the Disinformation Governance Board, an advisory board within the Department of Homeland Security, to be shut down, slamming the body as "Orwellian". 

In November 2022, Carr travelled to Taipei, Taiwan to attend meetings on cybersecurity and telecommunications matters. In doing so, he became the first member of the agency to visit the island in an official capacity.

Political positions 
Carr is an opponent of net neutrality protections and has endorsed efforts to reform Section 230 of the Communications Decency Act. Carr vehemently opposed efforts to block the acquisition of Twitter by Elon Musk.

TikTok regulation 
A critic of TikTok, Carr has accused the platform of harming users and undermining national security, and has referred to TikTok as "digital fentanyl". Carr has said that parents whose children use the application should be concerned with their privacy. The FCC has no authority to regulate online content and platforms like TikTok, and has limited powers to restrict or ban speech.

In June 2022, Carr wrote an open letter urging Apple and Google to remove TikTok from their respective app stores, arguing the platform poses a security risk. In a November 2022 interview with Axios, Carr reiterated that he believes the Committee on Foreign Investment in the United States (CFIUS) should ban TikTok. 

Carr privately wrote a letter to Jonathan Kanter, Assistant Attorney General for the Department of Justice (DOJ) Antitrust Division, where he urged the DOJ to scrutinize Apple and Google's handling of TikTok on their app stores.

References

External links

1979 births
21st-century American lawyers
Lawyers from Washington, D.C.
Georgetown College (Georgetown University) alumni
Columbus School of Law alumni
Living people
Members of the Federal Communications Commission
Federal Communications Commission personnel
Trump administration personnel